The  Asian Baseball Championship was the seventeenth continental tournament held by the Baseball Federation of Asia. The tournament was held in Perth, Australia for the second and likely last time; Australia has not participated in the tournament since joining the Baseball Confederation of Oceania. The tournament was won by defending champions Japan; their eleventh Asian Championship and their third consecutive title, equalling the record they set in two separate sequences previously: 1955-1959-1962 and 1965-1967-1967.

North Korea made their first, and through , their only appearance at the tournament—finishing 6th—and became the ninth team to contest the championship. South Korea (2nd), Chinese Taipei (3rd), Australia (4th) China (5th) and Philippines (7th) were the other participants.

References

Bibliography 
 

1993
1993
Asian Baseball Championship
1993 in Australian sport
February 1993 sports events in Australia
March 1993 sports events in Australia